Corfe Mullen  is a village in Dorset, England, on the north-western urban fringe of the South East Dorset conurbation. The village had a population of 10,133 at the 2011 Census. It is served by six churches, four pubs, five schools, a library, various shops and local businesses, a village hall, and many community and sports organisations. On 10 December 2019 The Corfe Mullen Parish Council resolved to adopt Town Council status, citing potential financial benefits. In all other aspects Corfe Mullen is still very much a village, albeit a large one.

The mill referred to is the old water mill on the River Stour, mentioned in the Domesday Book, where the village originally stood.

Despite the proximity of the urban area, Corfe Mullen is surrounded by Green Belt. It lies within the Dorset Heaths.

History

Early nomadic tribes and settlers 
The first evidence of people living in the area consists mainly of a number of flint axeheads that have been found within the village and which date from the Palaeolithic and Mesolithic (Old and Middle Stone Ages). Around 3000 BC, the first real settlers came, cleared the forests and began to farm, although even they were largely nomadic. Later settlers, during the Bronze Age, built burial mounds or barrows, examples of which may be found to the east of the village at Barrow Hill and at Naked Cross at the southern end of the village.  These forms of occupation continued into the Iron Age; evidence of pottery manufactured around the 1st century BC may be found at East End. Just prior to the coming of the Romans, in around 50 BC, the area was inhabited by the Belgae.

Romans 
The Roman Second Legion under Vespasian arrived in the Corfe Mullen area during the fifth decade of the 1st century AD and built a  fortress just to the north of the village at Lake Farm.  The location of this fortress was important; the River Stour provided a defensive barrier to the north and the site is only  from the Iron Age hillfort at Badbury Rings. Lake cut this important tribal centre off from the settlements at Dudsbury and Hengistbury Head.

To subjugate the local tribes and keep themselves supplied and in communication with other Roman centres, the Legion built several roads that run through or close to the area.  Probably the most important of these, and the only one visible today, is the road that connected the deep water anchorage at Morionio (now Hamworthy) and Lake, and continues northwards to Badbury and Hod Hill.  This road forms the eastern boundary of the village. Traces of two other roads have also been found, both of which are underneath or follow the course of modern roads; one of these linked Lake with Dorchester, and is roughly aligned with the A31, the other ran through the spine of the village and followed the present road to Wareham.

Although the Roman occupation of Britain lasted nearly 400 years, the military presence at Corfe Mullen was very short lived, lasting only until the 1st century's seventh decade. However the Roman influence continued in agriculture and industry even after they had left and the Celtic-speaking people that descended from the original tribes took over the area again.

Saxons 
The Saxons probably settled in the area around the 7th century. Christianity arrived before 700 AD and open-air services are believed to have been held on the same site as the present-day old village church.  During the centuries leading up to the millennium, division of land into hundreds, and tithe took place and Manorial courts dealt with disputes.  The name of Corf came into usage during this period and was located in the hundred of Cogdean, with the court being held at Cogdean Elms in the north of the present village.

A number of other land holdings dating from this period have been found around the village, the most notable being at Mountain Clump and the Knoll, where the remains of cottages may be seen.

Norman period and Middle Ages 
After the Norman Conquest, Corf's entry in the Domesday Book shows that it appears to have been a single manor under 'Robert, son of Gerold', but was previously held by two Saxon lords: Waga and Egelric.  At some time during the next two or three centuries, the village reverted to two manors: probably Corf Molin and Corf Hubert. The latter manor was almost certainly named after a former lord, Hubert de la Vielle. By 1469 the two manors were combined into one again, although the two names were still preserved at that time.  It was probably another century before the present-day name came about. This merger was probably driven by the general depopulation of the country that occurred in the Middle Ages due to migration to the towns and the Black Death.

A third part of the village came to be known as Corfe Mullen St Nicholas. The origin of this appears to date back to a land acquisition by St Nicholas Hospital (a Salisbury charity) in 1279. The present-day areas of Lambs Green, East End and Brog Street were still called this until the early part of the 20th century.

Construction of the original parish church, then called St Nicholas but now St Hubert's, was commenced during the 13th century, with the tower being added a little later.

Elizabethan to Georgian period 

After the major changes seen after the Normans, a period of stability came to the village for about 300 years. From Elizabethan to Georgian times prosperity increased, with a number of wealthy families being the major landowners. None of these families built their homes within the parish boundaries, although the Phelipps family took over an Elizabethan Manor House (the Court House) near the church and lived there for many years. Other architectural legacies of this period are some notable farm houses, a few cottages and the original building that housed Lockyer's Charity School, formed in 1706 by Richard Lockyer. This building is still used by the present-day Lockyer's Middle School.

During the latter half of the 18th century, a toll road was constructed by private enterprise; Higher Blandford Road and Mill Street were part of a new route between Poole and Blandford which resulted in the people of Corfe Mullen having access to the major markets of these two towns.

Victorian era 
During the reign of Queen Victoria, more toll roads were constructed, including an extension to Mill Street which provided a new route from Bere Regis to Wimborne. The railways arrived by the late 19th century, with tracks first appearing within walking distance of the village at Wimborne and later with a route that went through the village, though it was well into the 20th century before a halt was provided.

20th century 
In the 20th century development accelerated. Development between the wars occurred along Higher Blandford Road and Wareham Road, with the populated area gradually extending up the hill, away from the original riverside centre at Mill Street and the older cottages at Brog Street, Lambs Green and East End.

African American troops came to stay in Corfe Mullen in around 1942, taking over big houses such as Glendon and The Towers. These included soldiers from the 1317th Engineer General Services Regiment who came to build the Tarrant Rushton aerodrome for the use of “Dakota” transport aircraft and gliders, in preparation for D-Day.  

The village was known at the time as 'Little Harlem'.

In the 1950s and 1960s major new housing estates were built around Phelipps Road and Hilltop Road, and in the last forty years of the century, new housing was built on most of the area between Broadstone and the eastern boundary of the village.

During the early part of the century, the village became known for its violet and lavender cultivation, which was centred around Violet Farm and Lavender Lodge (previously Corfe Lodge). Following a decline in trade, Violet Farm was demolished in the 1960s – along with a 300-year-old tithe barn – to make way for new bungalows.

21st century 
During the first decade of the 21st century, proposals were made by the South West Regional Assembly to build 800 new homes on green belt land on the edge of the village. These plans were opposed by a majority of villagers. The developments were shelved and East Dorset District Council later published more modest plans to build on the sites of the middle school or recreation ground. The adoption of any of these sites would require relocation of the school or recreational facilities. A public consultation period ended in January 2011, and the results are awaited.

Facilities 
Corfe Mullen is a dormitory settlement for people working in the nearby towns and cities of Wimborne, Poole, Bournemouth, Ferndown, Verwood and Southampton. It is one of the biggest villages in England. The countryside around the village is split between agriculture and heathland, with woodland to be found fringing most areas, the largest of which is Stoney Down Plantation to the west. The existence of many bridleways criss-crossing the area around the village encourages horse riding, and there are a number of stables nearby.  The village also has a large recreation ground with facilities for outdoor sports, including football, cricket and tennis. This is run by the Corfe Mullen Sports Association, which is made up of volunteers from various sports clubs around Corfe Mullen. There are new allotments on Broadmoor Road that have been in use since 1 November 2019, replacing the old allotments near Lockyer's School which are being built on.

Churches 
 St Hubert's, the original parish church, located on the Blandford Road in the Stour valley
 St Nicholas, the new Anglican church, on the Wareham Road in the northern part of the main conurbation
 Corfe Mullen Baptist Church (Chapel in the Valley)
 Sunnyhill Church Corfe Mullen, on the Wareham Road in the northern part of the main conurbation
 Knoll Farm Christian Fellowship, in the farmland to the west of the main village

Pubs 
 The Coventry Arms
 The Dorset Soldier
 The Holme Bush
 The Lambs Green Inn
 Royal British Legion

Cafés and restaurants 
 Taj (Indian & Bengali cuisine).
 Chinese Whispers.
 And Coffee.

Schools 
 Henbury View First School
 Lockyer's Middle School
 Rushcombe First School
 Corfe Hills School (in Broadstone on the boundary with Corfe Mullen, which serves older village children)
 Castle Court School (a private school for 3- to 13-year-olds)
 Chapel in the Valley Pre-School (at the rear of the Baptist Church, for 2- to 5-year-olds)
 Jack and Jill Day Nursery
 Tops Day Nursery

Library 
 Corfe Mullen Library, 54 Wareham Road (by the co-op supermarket)

Children's Centre 
 Corfe Mullen's Sure Start Children's Centre, 54 Wareham Road (The Children's Centre and library share the same building)

Sport
Corfe Mullen Cricket Club runs a number of senior and junior sides catering for all abilities and is based at Corfe Mullen Recreation Ground under the auspices of the Corfe Mullen Sports Association. Other members of the association include tennis and football clubs, and most recently even a baseball team. There is also the BH Live Sports Centre which has a pool, gym and tennis courts. It hosts approximately 120 classes a week
The village in recent years has hosted a number of Motorcycle Grasstrack events. The biggest of which is the British Masters hosted in 2015. It was run by the Wimborne Motorcycle Club on behalf of the ACU.

Other places of entertainment 
Apart from the local pubs, a weekly youth club is held near to Lockyer's School and one at Knoll Farm Church on a Friday evening. Various activities are available in the village hall. For those who require entertainment of a more commercial nature, Wimborne, Poole and Bournemouth provide a good choice with cinemas, theatres, and night clubs.

Nature park 
In 2016, Corfe Barrows Nature Park was opened. The nature park comprises eight natural areas, two of which lie wholly or partially within Corfe Mullen: the Happy Bottom Nature Reserve and Cogdean Elms. The remaining areas lie just over the municipal boundary within the Borough of Poole, but are easily accessible from the village.

Demographics 
As of the 2021 Census, the village had a population of approximately 10,400 people, with an area of 12.27 square kilometres. The village had a density of 846 people per square kilometre. The median age of the village was 47 years. The ethnic makeup of the village was 97.6% White, 0.9% Asian, 0.1% Black, 1.2% Mixed or from Multiple ethnic groups, and 0.3% from other ethnic groups. The religious composition of the village was 47.7% Christian, 45.0% No Religion, 0.4% Muslim, 0.2% Buddhist, 0.1% Hindu, 0.1% Jewish, and 0.5% belonged to another religion.

Notable residents 
 Isaac Gulliver, the famous Smuggler lived in Highe House in East End
 William Joyce, who is better known as 'Lord Haw-Haw', once lived in the Court House.
 Gladys Mitchell, the detective writer and creator of Mrs Bradley, lived in the village at the end of her life.
 Hugh Miles, British filmmaker who specialises in wildlife films.

Notes

References 

 A History of Dorset, John Hutchins, 1774
 A Neolithic "A" Habitation Site at Corfe Mullen, JB Calkin, MA & Stuart Piggot, FSA, Proceedings of the Dorset Natural History and Archaeological Society, Vol 60, 1938
 The Course of the Hamworthy – Badbury Roman Road, HP Smith, MBE, BA, FCP, Proceedings of the Dorset Natural History and Archaeological Society, Vol 65, 1943
 Proceedings of the Dorset Natural History and Archaeological Society, Vol 83, 1961
 Some Early Iron Age Sites in the Bournemouth Area, J Bernard Calkin, MA, FSA, Proceedings of the Dorset Natural History and Archaeological Society, Vol 86, 1965
 Ramblings in the Past: The Story of Corfe Mullen, J Bernard Calkin
 The Romano-British Settlement at Corfe Mullen, J Bernard Calkin, MA
 Corfe Mullen: The Origins of a Dorset Village, 1988, Norman Field
 The Millennium Exhibits – Corfe Mullen Parish Council Office
 Corfe Mullen Parish Plan 2006
 Dorset Smugglers, Roger Guttridge, 1986

External links 

 Census data
 Corfe Mullen Town Council
 
 Corfe Mullen Online – Community Website
 Corfe Mullen Cricket Club

 
Villages in Dorset
Civil parishes in Dorset
East Dorset District